Novello may refer to:

Places
 Novello, Piedmont, a comune in the Province of Cuneo, Italy
 Novello Theatre, a theatre in the City of Westminster, London, England

People

Given name
 Clara Novello Davies (1861–1943), Welsh singer, named after Clara Novello
 Novello Novelli (1930–2018), Italian character actor

Other uses
 Ivor Novello Awards, a British songwriting award
 Novello & Co, an English publisher
 Vino Novello, an Italian wine

See also